Narsing Yadav (15 May 1963 – 31 December 2020) was an Indian actor known for his comic villain roles. He acted in more than 300 films predominantly in Telugu, in addition to Hindi and Tamil languages. He debuted as a small character artist and was primarily cast as a villain and comedy actor. He died on 31 December 2020 from kidney-related ailments.

Personal life 
Narsing was born in Hyderabad to Rajaiah and Lakshmi Narasamma. He completed his primary education in Raja Kandaswamy School. His highest qualification was Intermediate (Plus 2). He was married to Chitra Yadav and had a son named Ruthvik Yadav

Filmography
Narsing played notable roles in Kshana Kshanam, Gaayam, Mutha Mestri, Aithe, Mass, Shankar Dada M.B.B.S., Anukokunda Oka Roju and Nuvvostanante Nenoddantana.

Narsing was considered a "permanent" actor in Ram Gopal Varma's films.

Telugu
{{columns-list|colwidth=22em|
 Kshana Kshanam (1991) as Narsing
 Killer (1992) as Head of Security
 Lathi (1992) as Goon
 Mutha Mestri (1993)
 Mayalodu (1993) as Goon
 Gaayam (1993) as Narsing
 Rajendrudu Gajendrudu (1993) as Goon
 Allari Premikudu (1994) as Kidnapper
 Chilakkottudu (1997)
 Anaganaga Oka Roju (1997)
 Master (1997)
 Chandralekha (1998) as Financer
 Preminche Manasu (1999)
 Family Circus (2001)
 Hyderabad (2001) as Narsing
 Valayam (2002) as Politician
 Idiot (2002) as Gangster and politician
 Adrustam (2002)
 Ninu Choodaka Nenundalenu (2002)
 Aithe (2003) as Minister
 Johnny (2003)
 Tagore (2003)
 Satyam (2003) as MLA
 Varsham (2004) as Bus driver
 Sye (2004)
 Shankar Dada M.B.B.S. (2004)
 Mass (2004)
 Adavi Ramudu (2004)
 Madhyanam Hathya (2004)
 Letha Manasulu (2004)
 Nuvvostanante Nenoddantana (2005) as Narasimha
 Anukokunda Oka Roju (2005) as Machavarapu Abbulu
 Nayakudu (2005) 
 Seenugadu Chiranjeevi Fan (2005)
 Andaru Dongale Dorikite (2004)
 Hungama (2005)
 Athanokkade (2005)
 Paisalo Parmathma (2006)
 Nuvve (2006)
 Pournami (2006) as Servant
 Pokiri (2006) as Dasanna
 Roommates (2006)
 Tulasi (2007)
 4 Boys (2007)
 Amma Cheppindi (2006)
 Annavaram (2006)
 Poramboku (2007)
 Desamuduru (2007)
 Sainikudu (2006)
 Aata (2007)
 Gundamma Gaari Manavadu (2007)
 Jagadam (2007)
 Yamadonga (2007) as Yamakinkarudu
 Viyyalavari Kayyalu (2007)
 Vishaka Express (2008)
 Vaana (2008)
 Current (2009)
 Aatadista (2008)
 Hero (2008)
 Baladur (2008)
 Raksha (2008) as Shyam
 King (2008)
 Siddham (2009)
 Kick (2009)
 Gopi Gopika Godavari (2009)
 Seetharamula Kalyanam (2010)
 Darling (2010)
 Saradaga Kasepu (2010)
 Leader (2010)
 Baava (2010)
 Ragada (2010)
 Mirapakaay (2011)
 Vastadu Naa Raju (2011)
 Katha Screenplay Darshakatvam Appalaraju (2011) as Daivagna Chari
 Pilla Zamindar (2011) as Adavi Rambabu
 Daruvu (2012) as Cowardy Gunda
 Sudigadu (2012)
 Potugadu (2013)
 Race Gurram (2014)
 Pataas (2015)
 Subramanyam For Sale (2015) as Narsing
       Dongaata (2015) as Baapji
 Temper (2015)
 Attack (2016)
 Khaidi No. 150 (2017)
}}

Hindi
 Daud: Fun on the Run (1997) as Inspector Rana
 Prem Qaidi (1991) as Driver
 Naukar Biwi Ka (1983) .... Crowd scene - extra waiting outside studio

Tamil

 Baashha (1995)
 Kuruvi (2008)
 Laadam (2009)
 Aatanayagan (2010)
 Rajapattai (2011)
 Poojai'' (2014)

References

External links
 

1968 births
2020 deaths
Male actors from Hyderabad, India
Telugu male actors
Telugu comedians
Indian male comedians
Male actors in Telugu cinema
Indian male film actors
Male actors in Tamil cinema
Male actors in Hindi cinema
20th-century Indian male actors
21st-century Indian male actors